Richard Newton Gardner (July 9, 1927 – February 16, 2019) was an American diplomat who served as the United States Ambassador to Spain and the United States Ambassador to Italy. He was also a professor emeritus of law at Columbia Law School.

Life and career
Gardner was born in New York City, New York, the son of Ethel ( Alias) and Samuel Gardner (former family name was Goldberg). He served in the United States Armed Forces during World War II. Gardner graduated from Harvard University with a B.A. degree in Economics, a J.D. from Yale Law School, and was a Rhodes Scholar, receiving a Doctor of Philosophy degree in Economics from Oxford University. He wrote several books and articles. Gardner became a member of the American Academy of Arts and Sciences in 1974 and a member of the American Philosophical Society in 1998. Gardner died in New York City on February 16, 2019, at the age of 91.

References

External links

1927 births
2019 deaths
Military personnel from New York City
Writers from New York City
Ambassadors of the United States to Spain
Ambassadors of the United States to Italy
American Rhodes Scholars
Yale Law School alumni
Columbia Law School faculty
Harvard College alumni
Alumni of the University of Oxford
Members of the American Philosophical Society
20th-century American diplomats